The Shiva temple, Kera, also known as Lakheshwara temple of Kerakot, is located in Kera village near Bhuj of Kutch district in Gujarat, India. The temple was built during the reign of the Chaulukya dynasty (Solankis) in the later part of the 10th Century (9th to 11th century) and is dedicated to Shiva. The temple has been subjected to severe earthquake damages during the earthquake of 1819 and the Bhuj earthquake of 2001. But the temple's spire, inner sanctum and the sculptures are still in an attractive condition.

Location 
The Shiva temple is located in Kera village in Bhuj of Kutch district in Gujarat. Bhuj is the nearest rail head with two  express trains, the Bhuj Express and the Kutch Express operating between Bhuj, Ahmedabad and Mumbai. Bhuj is also the airport which connects to Mumbai.

History 

The Shiva temple of Kera is dated to the later part of the 10th Century (9th to 11th century is also mentioned), built during the reign of the Chaulukya dynasty (Solankis). Close to this temple, there is the Fort of Kapilkot, which is also in a dilapidated condition. The temple is ascribed to Ra Lakha Phulani who was ruling his capital at Kapilkot. In the 1819 Rann of Kutch earthquake, the temple was substantially damaged, leaving only the main spire and inner sanctum in a good condition. It was again damaged to some extent during the Bhuj earthquake.

Features 

The interior part of the temple is square in shape, each side . The shrine has a circumlocutory passageway or pradakshina which is of 2-foot-6-inch width. This passage gets natural lighting from two open cut-stone perforated windows. There are a few well-carved sculptures on the wall. The spire of the temple is well-executed with ornamentation of eight triangle-shaped sculptures in the form of chaitya windows on each face of the spire. Hemmed between the windows are well-crafted sculptures of human figures. These sculptural formations are repeated one above the other in gradually reducing size, as the height of the spire increases. At the corners of the shrine, there are miniature spires, and the same type are built above them in an interior set-in feature which lies at the main large central spire. The external faces of the spires are well-ornamented with elegantly carved sculptures. There are many stone sculptures of Yakshas around the temple premises. An annual fair is held here which is attended by a large number of devotees.

References

Bibliography 

Hindu temples in Gujarat
Shiva temples in Gujarat
Kutch district